The Cabinet Beck IV was the state government of the German state of Rhineland-Palatinate from 18 May 2006 until 18 May 2011. The Cabinet was headed by Minister President Kurt Beck and was formed by the Social Democratic Party, after Schröder's winning of the 2006 Rhineland-Palatinate state election. On 18 May 2006 Beck was re-elected and sworn in as Minister President by the Landtag of Rhineland-Palatinate. It was succeeded by Beck's fifth and last cabinet.

Composition 

|}

Cabinets of Rhineland-Palatinate
2006 establishments in Germany
2011 disestablishments in Germany